In topology, the Vietoris–Rips complex, also called the Vietoris complex or Rips complex, is a way of forming a topological space from distances in a set of points. It is an abstract simplicial complex that can be defined from any metric space M and distance δ by forming a simplex for every finite set of points that has diameter at most δ. That is, it is a family of finite subsets of M, in which we think of a subset of k points as forming a (k − 1)-dimensional simplex (an edge for two points, a triangle for three points, a tetrahedron for four points, etc.); if a finite set S has the property that the distance between every pair of points in S is at most δ, then we include S as a simplex in the complex.

History

The Vietoris–Rips complex was originally called the Vietoris complex, for Leopold Vietoris, who introduced it as a means of extending homology theory from simplicial complexes to metric spaces.

Relation to Čech complex
The Vietoris–Rips complex is closely related to the Čech complex (or nerve) of a set of balls, which has a simplex for every finite subset of balls with nonempty intersection. In a geodesically convex space Y, the Vietoris–Rips complex of any subspace X ⊂ Y for distance δ has the same points and edges as the Čech complex of the set of balls of radius δ/2 in Y that are centered at the points of X. However, unlike the Čech complex, the Vietoris–Rips complex of X depends only on the intrinsic geometry of X, and not on any embedding of X into some larger space.

As an example, consider the uniform metric space M3 consisting of three points, each at unit distance from each other. The Vietoris–Rips complex of M3, for δ = 1, includes a simplex for every subset of points in M3, including a triangle for M3 itself. If we embed M3 as an equilateral triangle in the Euclidean plane, then the Čech complex of the radius-1/2 balls centered at the points of M3 would contain all other simplexes of the Vietoris–Rips complex but would not contain this triangle, as there is no point of the plane contained in all three balls. However, if M3 is instead embedded into a metric space that contains a fourth point at distance 1/2 from each of the three points of M3, the Čech complex of the radius-1/2 balls in this space would contain the triangle. Thus, the Čech complex of fixed-radius balls centered at M3 differs depending on which larger space M3 might be embedded into, while the Vietoris–Rips complex remains unchanged.

If any metric space X is embedded in an injective metric space Y, the Vietoris–Rips complex for distance δ and X coincides with the Čech complex of the balls of radius δ/2 centered at the points of X in Y. Thus, the Vietoris–Rips complex of any metric space M equals the Čech complex of a system of balls in the tight span of M.

Relation to unit disk graphs and clique complexes
The Vietoris–Rips complex for δ = 1 contains an edge for every pair of points that are at unit distance or less in the given metric space. As such, its 1-skeleton is the unit disk graph of its points. It contains a simplex for every clique in the unit disk graph, so it is the clique complex or flag complex of the unit disk graph. More generally, the clique complex of any graph G is a Vietoris–Rips complex for the metric space having as points the vertices of G and having as its distances the lengths of the shortest paths in G.

Other results

If M is a closed Riemannian manifold, then for sufficiently small values of δ the Vietoris–Rips complex of M, or of spaces sufficiently close to M, is homotopy equivalent to M itself.

 describe efficient algorithms for determining whether a given cycle is contractible in the Rips complex of any finite point set in the Euclidean plane.

Applications
As with unit disk graphs, the Vietoris–Rips complex has been applied in computer science to model the topology of ad hoc wireless communication networks. One advantage of the Vietoris–Rips complex in this application is that it can be determined only from the distances between the communication nodes, without having to infer their exact physical locations. A disadvantage is that, unlike the Čech complex, the Vietoris–Rips complex does not directly provide information about gaps in communication coverage, but this flaw can be ameliorated by sandwiching the Čech complex between two Vietoris–Rips complexes for different values of δ. An implementation of Vietoris-Rips complexes can be found in the TDAstats R package.

Vietoris–Rips complexes have also been applied for feature-extraction in digital image data; in this application, the complex is built from a high-dimensional metric space in which the points represent low-level image features.

Notes

References

.
.
.
.
.
.
.
.
.
.
.

Algebraic topology
Geometric graph theory
Simplicial sets